The Beriev Be-112 is a proposed amphibian aircraft with two propeller engines, projected to carry 27 passengers. The Beriev firm lacks a production amphibian aircraft in this size.

Intended purposes of the Be-112 include passenger and cargo carriage, ambulance missions, surveillance, and search-and-rescue missions. Beriev also explored a version of the Be-112 with wing-mounted turboprop engines

Specifications (proposed)

References

Sources

 beriev.com

Be-0112
Proposed aircraft of Russia
Amphibious aircraft
Twin-turboprop tractor aircraft